Néstor David Álvarez Gutiérrez (born April 11, 1980), or simply known as Néstor, is a Colombian footballer. He played as a forward for Portuguese football club Académica de Coimbra in the Portuguese Liga.

Nestor was born in a poor family in Medellín, Colombia, at a time when civil unrest in the country would not end. He grew up with football, his hero being Carlos Valderrama, and he excelled on the pitch.

External links 
Profile at Foradejogo.net

1980 births
Living people
Footballers from Medellín
Colombian footballers
Colombian expatriate footballers
Independiente Medellín footballers
Associação Académica de Coimbra – O.A.F. players
UA Maracaibo players
Alianza F.C. footballers
Águilas Doradas Rionegro players
Primeira Liga players
Expatriate footballers in Portugal
Expatriate footballers in Venezuela
Expatriate footballers in El Salvador
Colombian expatriate sportspeople in Portugal
Association football forwards